Arhopala semperi  is a butterfly in the family Lycaenidae. It was described by George Thomas Bethune-Baker in 1896. It is found in the Indomalayan realm (Borneo) and as A. s. russelli Eliot, 1962 in Peninsular Malaya. The specific name honours Georg Semper.

References

External links

Arhopala Boisduval, 1832 at Markku Savela's Lepidoptera and Some Other Life Forms. Retrieved June 3, 2017.

Arhopala
Butterflies described in 1896